Robert de Sancta Agatha was an English medieval archdeacon.

Robert was an Archdeacon of Northumberland. In 1256, he was elected but declined the position of Bishop of Carlisle. He was subsequently Archdeacon of Durham. He may also have been an official of in the Diocese of Lincoln.

See also
 Richard de Sancta Agatha

References

Year of birth unknown
Year of death unknown
13th-century English Roman Catholic priests
Archdeacons of Northumberland
Archdeacons of Durham